Gillham is a town in Sevier County, Arkansas, United States. The population was 188 at the 2000 census. It is located six miles from Gillham Lake.

Geography
Gillham is located at  (34.170083, -94.315529).

According to the United States Census Bureau, the town has a total area of 2.3 km2 (0.9 mi2), of which 2.2 km2 (0.9 mi2) is land and 1.15% is water.

Demographics

As of the census of 2000, there were 188 people, 74 households, and 54 families residing in the town.  The population density was 84.4/km2 (218.6/mi2).  There were 86 housing units at an average density of 38.6/km2 (100.0/mi2).  The racial makeup of the town was 89.36% White, 0.53% Native American, 1.06% Asian, 7.45% from other races, and 1.60% from two or more races.  10.64% of the population were Hispanic or Latino of any race.

There were 74 households, out of which 36.5% had children under the age of 18 living with them, 51.4% were married couples living together, 10.8% had a female householder with no husband present, and 27.0% were non-families. 20.3% of all households were made up of individuals, and 4.1% had someone living alone who was 65 years of age or older.  The average household size was 2.54 and the average family size was 2.87.

In the town, the population was spread out, with 26.1% under the age of 18, 10.6% from 18 to 24, 30.3% from 25 to 44, 25.0% from 45 to 64, and 8.0% who were 65 years of age or older.  The median age was 35 years. For every 100 females, there were 116.1 males.  For every 100 females age 18 and over, there were 113.8 males.

The median income for a household in the town was $24,375, and the median income for a family was $24,375. Males had a median income of $25,469 versus $15,208 for females. The per capita income for the town was $10,758.  About 16.0% of families and 23.8% of the population were below the poverty line, including 34.9% of those under the age of 18 and 17.4% of those 65 or over.

Education
The DeQueen School District operates area public schools. The Gillham School District consolidated into the DeQueen district on July 1, 1986.

References

Towns in Sevier County, Arkansas
Towns in Arkansas